William Perraton (27 August 1867 – 23 September 1952) was an Australian cricketer. He played one first-class cricket match for Victoria in 1900.

See also
 List of Victoria first-class cricketers

References

External links
 

1867 births
1952 deaths
Australian cricketers
Victoria cricketers
Cricketers from Melbourne